Debra Brimhall (born August 13, 1958) is a former member of the Arizona House of Representatives. She served in the House from January 1997 through January 2003, serving district 4. After redistricting in 2002, she ran for re-election in District 5, but lost in the Republican primary to Jake Flake and Bill Konopnicki.

References

Republican Party members of the Arizona House of Representatives
1958 births
Living people